The U.S. House Financial Services Subcommittee on Domestic and International Monetary Policy, Trade, and Technology was a subcommittee of the House Committee on Financial Services. In the 111th Congress it was split into two subcommittees: Domestic Monetary Policy and Technology, and International Monetary Policy and Trade.

Jurisdiction
The subcommittee's jurisdiction includes domestic monetary policy, and agencies which directly or indirectly affect domestic monetary policy, multilateral development lending institutions such as the World Bank, coins and currency including operations of the Bureau of the Mint and the Bureau of Engraving and Printing, and international trade and finance including all matters pertaining to the International Monetary Fund and the Export-Import Bank.

Members, 110th Congress

External links
Official Homepage

Financial Services Domestic and International Monetary Policy, Trade, and Technology
Monetary policy of the United States